The Year of Living Dangerously is a 1982 Australian romantic drama film directed by Peter Weir and co-written by Weir and David Williamson. It was adapted from Christopher Koch's 1978 novel The Year of Living Dangerously. The story is about a love affair set in Indonesia during the overthrow of President Sukarno. It follows a group of foreign correspondents in Jakarta on the eve of an attempted coup by the 30 September Movement in 1965.

The film stars Mel Gibson as Australian journalist Guy Hamilton, and Sigourney Weaver as British Embassy officer Jill Bryant. It also stars Linda Hunt as a Chinese-Australian man with dwarfism, Billy Kwan, Hamilton's local photographer contact, a role for which Hunt won the 1983 Academy Award for Best Supporting Actress. The film was shot in both Australia and the Philippines and includes Australian actors Bill Kerr as Colonel Henderson and Noel Ferrier as Wally O'Sullivan.

It was banned from being shown in Indonesia until 2000, after the forced resignation of coup-leader and political successor Suharto in 1998. The title The Year of Living Dangerously is a quote which refers to a famous Italian phrase used by Sukarno: vivere pericolosamente, meaning "living dangerously". Sukarno used the line for the title of his Indonesian Independence Day speech of 1964.

Plot
Guy Hamilton, a neophyte foreign correspondent for an Australian TV network, arrives in Jakarta on assignment. He meets the close-knit members of the foreign correspondent community, including journalists from the UK, the US, and New Zealand, diplomatic personnel—and Billy Kwan, a Chinese-Australian man with dwarfism, high intelligence, and moral seriousness. Hamilton is initially unsuccessful because his predecessor, tired of life in Indonesia, had departed without introducing Hamilton to his contacts. He receives limited sympathy from the journalist community, which competes for scraps of information from Sukarno's regime, the Communist Party of Indonesia (PKI), and the conservative Muslim-dominated Indonesian military. However, Billy takes a liking to Guy and arranges interviews for him with key political figures.

Billy introduces Guy to Jill Bryant, a beautiful young assistant at the British embassy. Billy and Jill are close friends, yet Billy subtly manipulates her encounters with Guy. After resisting Guy because she's returning to the UK, Jill falls in love with him. Discovering that the Communist Chinese are arming the PKI, Jill passes this information to Guy to save his life, but he wants to cover the Communist rebellion that will occur when the arms shipment reaches Jakarta. Shocked, Billy and Jill cut off contact with Guy, and he is left with the American journalist, Pete Curtis, and his own assistant and driver Kumar, who is secretly a member of the PKI. Kumar, however, remains loyal to Guy, and tries to open his eyes to all that is going on.

Billy, outraged by Sukarno's failure to meet the needs of most Indonesians, decides to hang a sign saying "Sukarno feed your people" from the Hotel Indonesia expressing his outrage, but is thrown from the window by security men, and dies in Guy's arms. His death is also witnessed by Jill. Still in search of "the big story", Guy visits the Presidential palace after the army generals have taken over and unleashed executions, after they learned of the Communist shipment. Struck down by an Army officer, Guy suffers a detached retina. Resting alone in Billy's bungalow, Guy recalls a passage from the Bhagavad Gita, "all is clouded by desire", which Billy told him. Kumar visits him and tells him about the failed coup attempt. Risking permanent damage to his eye, a bandaged Guy implores Kumar to drive him to the airport, where he boards the last plane out of Jakarta and is reunited with Jill.

Cast

Production

Development
A number of filmmakers were interested in buying the rights to Christopher Koch's novel including Phillip Noyce. It was Peter Weir who was successful. Koch wrote an early draft but Weir was unhappy with it. Alan Sharp wrote three more drafts, then David Williamson was brought on to do several more drafts. Koch later came back on to work on some of the voice over, although he never spoke with Peter Weir. Koch later claimed that the final script was "55% Williamson/Weir, and 45% Koch".

The film was originally backed by the South Australian Film Corporation and the Australian Film Commission, with international distribution arranged by MGM/UA Entertainment Company. However, the SAFC then dropped out and Weir's agent suggested MGM provide the entire $6 million budget themselves, which is what happened. It was by far the most ambitious Australian film undertaken at the time and was one of the first co-productions between Australia and a Hollywood studio.

Casting

Dancer David Atkins was originally cast as Billy Kwan. However, during rehearsals Weir began to feel that the relationship between his character and Mel Gibson's was not working so he decided to recast. Several actors auditioned, including Bob Balaban and Wallace Shawn, when Weir saw a photo of Linda Hunt. He asked for her to audition and decided to cast her. Weir said on casting Hunt, "I never would have started out looking for a woman, But from the moment I saw her test, I knew she was appropriate."
To accomplish the role during production, Hunt shortened "her hair and dye[d] it black[,] wore padding around her waist, shaved her eyebrows, and carried something in her shirt pocket." In her 1986 interview with Bomb magazine, Hunt agreed with the interviewer's remarks that Billy Kwan "is supra-personal [with] layers of sexual ambiguity[.]"

Filming
Although originally set to be filmed in Jakarta, permission to film in Indonesia was denied, so the bulk of the film was shot in the Philippines, in Manila's Quiapo district and the Banaue Rice Terraces. Weir said, "All slums look alike, after all." Death threats against Weir and Gibson from Muslims who believed the film would be anti-Islam forced the production to move to Australia. The crew moved to Sydney in early April 1982 during its fifth week of the six-week Philippine shoot with only a few small scenes remaining. Filming in Australia was for another six weeks.

Gibson downplayed the death threats, saying, "It wasn't really that bad. We got a lot of death threats to be sure, but I just assumed that when there are so many, it must mean nothing is really going to happen. I mean, if they meant to kill us, why send a note?"

Gibson described his character Guy, saying, "He's not a silver-tongued devil. He's kind of immature and he has some rough edges and I guess you could say the same for me."

Music
"L'Enfant", a track from Vangelis' 1979 album Opera sauvage, was featured in the film.

Release
The Year of Living Dangerously opened in Australia on 16 December 1982 at Sydney’s Pitt Centre.
The film was entered into the 1983 Cannes Film Festival attended by Weir, Gibson and Weaver to promote it, where it was well received by audiences and critics. Gibson attended the festival during a break from filming The Bounty in London.

Home media
The film was released for sale or rental in Australia on VHS in 1984 and on LaserDisc in 1985 with a runtime of 117-minute cut.
Warner Bros. released The Year of Living Dangerously in the United States on DVD in June 2000 with a theatrical trailer as the sole extra feature. In 2002 it was issued on DVD in Australia.

Reception

Box office
The film opened in Australia on 17 December 1982. Filmed on a budget of $6 million, The Year of Living Dangerously grossed $2,898,000 at the box office in Australia.

The film opened in the United States via limited release on 21 January 1983 before receiving a wide release on 18 February 1983. In its limited release opening weekend in the US, the film earned $35,000 from one theater. When released nationwide, the film ranked thirteenth in the box office grossing $1,716,040 on 690 theaters during the Presidents' Day weekend. In its sixth weekend since its limited opening (however, second nationwide release weekend), The Year of Living Dangerously made $1.2 million in 679 theaters (a total of $3,469,305 over that period), rising to eleventh. It then made $932,370 on its seventh weekend (third nationwide) a 25.7% drop, and $802,753 on its eighth weekend across 290 screens both finishing thirteenth.
After 49 weeks in theatres, the film would finish with a box office gross of $10.3 million.

Critical reception
On review aggregator website Rotten Tomatoes, the film has an 88% rating based on 32 reviews, with an average rating of 7.82/10. The site's consensus states: "Both a smart, suspenseful tale of intrigue and a sweeping romance, The Year of Living Dangerously features excellent performances from Mel Gibson as a journalist and Sigourney Weaver as a staffer at the British Embassy in Jakarta during the political unrest in Indonesia." Metacritic reports a 65 out of 100 rating based on 9 critics, indicating "generally favorable reviews". Film critic Roger Ebert of the Chicago Sun-Times gave the film four out of four stars and praised Hunt's performance: "Billy Kwan is played, astonishingly, by a woman—Linda Hunt, a New York stage actress who enters the role so fully that it never occurs to us that she is not a man. This is what great acting is, a magical transformation of one person into another". In his review for The New York Times, Vincent Canby praised Gibson's performance: "If this film doesn't make an international star of Mr. Gibson (Gallipoli, The Road Warrior), then nothing will. He possesses both the necessary talent and the screen presence".

However, Richard Corliss of Time wrote, "But in his attempt to blend his preoccupations with the plot of C. J. Koch's 1978 novel, Weir has perhaps packed too much imagery and information into his movie ... The plot becomes landlocked in true-life implausibilities; the characters rarely get a hold on the moviegoer's heart or lapels". In his review for the Washington Post, Gary Arnold described the film as "a grievously flawed yet compelling tale of political intrigue, certainly a triumph of atmosphere if not of coherent dramatization". Newsweek magazine called the film "an annoying failure because it fritters away so many rich opportunities".

For their work in the film, Weir was nominated for the Palme d'Or at the 1983 Cannes Film Festival and Hunt won the Academy Award for Best Supporting Actress.

Accolades

See also
 Indonesian mass killings of 1965–1966

References

External links
 
 
 
 
 
 
 The Year of Living Dangerously at Oz Movies

1982 films
Tagalog-language films
Filipino-language films
Indonesian-language films
1982 romantic drama films
Australian romantic drama films
Films scored by Maurice Jarre
Films about journalists
Films based on Australian novels
Films directed by Peter Weir
Films featuring a Best Supporting Actress Academy Award-winning performance
Films set in 1965
Films set in Australia
Films set in Indonesia
Films set in Jakarta
Films set in Manila
Films set in Sydney
Films set in the Philippines
Films shot in Australia
Films shot in Manila
Films shot in Sydney
Films shot in the Philippines
Indonesian mass killings of 1965–1966
Romantic period films
Transition to the New Order
Films about photojournalists
Films about coups d'état
1980s English-language films